Paúl René Moreno Camacho ( 1992–18 May 2017) was a Venezuelan student and  volunteer killed during the 2017 Venezuelan protests.

Killing 
On 18 May 2017, Paúl was nearby the Fuerzas Armadas Avenue in Maracaibo, when the driver of a vehicle rammed over a barricade, running over him and escaping from the scene. Moreno was transferred to the Adolfo Pons Hospital, where he died at the age of 24.

The killing of Paúl Moreno was documented in a report by a panel of independent experts from the Organization of American States, considering that it could constitute a crime against humanity committed in Venezuela along with other killings during the protests.

Investigations 
On 17 November 2017, Omar Barrios, held responsible for Paúl's death, was sentenced to 19 months of house arrest, after which he would have a presentation regime every 15 days. The sentence signed by the judge in charge of the case, Yesiré Rincón, incorrectly established that Moreno died in 2009 and not in 2017, and judge Rincón argued that the qualification of intentional homicide could not be applied because the criterion was approved in 2011. The irregularity of the sentence was denounced in a statement by Carlos Moreno, Paúl's brother.

See also 
 2017 Venezuelan protests
 Armando Cañizales
 Miguel Castillo
 Jairo Ortiz
 Juan Pablo Pernalete
 Neomar Lander
 Paola Ramírez
 Xiomara Scott
 Fabián Urbina
 David Vallenilla
 Timeline of the 2017 Venezuelan protests
 Vehicle-ramming attack

References 

People from Maracaibo
University of Zulia alumni
Road incident deaths in Venezuela
People murdered in Venezuela
1990s births
2017 deaths
Year of birth uncertain
2017 Venezuelan protests
2017 murders in Venezuela